Muhammad Kamil Tadjudin (3 November 19375 May 2017) was an Indonesian physician and professor in medical biology. He served as the Rector of the University of Indonesia (UI) from 1994 until 1998.

Early life and education 
Tadjudin was born on 3 January 1937 in Batavia, Dutch East Indies to a Betawi family. Upon finishing his high school education, Tadjudin studied medicine at the University of Indonesia (UI). During his studies in the university, Tadjudin became the assistant lecturer in biological studies in 1958. He graduated from the university as a doctor in 1962. Upon graduating from the university, Tadjudin pursued further studies on medical biology in 1963 and in the field of human genetics and medicine at the McGill University from 1963 until 1964.

Career 
Tadjudin returned to Indonesia shortly afterwards and began his career as a lecturer in the medicine faculty of UI. In the faculty, Tadjudin taught basic genetics, reproductive biology, cell genetics, as well as cell and molecular genetics. After working as a lecturer for several years, Tadjudin became the head of the faculty's biology section in 1969. Several years later, UI rector Mahar Mardjono appointed him as the rector's special assistant in research and library. In 1984, Tadjudin officially became a professor in medical biology. 

Tadjudin's career in UI began to rise following his appointment as first deputy rector on 3 June 1988. On 19 March 1993, UI's rector Sujudi was appointed as the health minister, and the day-to-day running of the university was handed over to Tadjudin as first deputy rector. Shortly afterwards, Tadjudin was elected by UI's academic senate as the university's rector and was installed as rector on 22 January 1994. 

During his tenure, the university implemented the non-thesis degree policy, which allowed students to graduate without publishing a thesis. The policy was enacted through a rector's decree on 26 February 1996, but was only announced a week later on 4 March 1996. The policy was met with controversy by the university's students, with some comparing it to a clearance sale. Tadjudin's first deputy, Asman Boedisantoso Ranakusuma, stated that the policy increased the number of UI graduates from an annual average of around 1000 graduates to 5000 graduates.

Tadjudin became the rector of UI until 16 February 1998 and was replaced by Asman. Several months after the end of his term, on May 1998 Tadjudin alongside with Asman and several other academicians visited President Suharto at his residence to discuss about his resignation and succession.

Later life 
Tadjudin continued his career in education as the Chairman of the National Accreditation Body for Higher Education (Badan Akreditasi Nasional Perguruan Tinggi, BAN-PT). He was appointed on 5 January 1999 and served for two terms until August 2007. 

In 2004, Tadjudin was asked by the Rector of the Syarif Hidayatullah State Muslim University, Azyumardi Azra, to assist him in establishing a medical faculty in the university. Tadjudin managed to establish the faculty and became its dean until 2015. Tadjudin continued to taught medicine in the Syarif Hidayatullah State Muslim University until his death. Tadjudin died on 5 May 2017 at the Metropolitan Medical Center Hospital in Jakarta and was buried at the Karet Bivak Public Cemetery.

Personal life 
Tadjudin was married to Oemi Alifah. The couple had two children.

References 

1937 births
2017 deaths
University of Indonesia alumni
Academic staff of the University of Indonesia
People from Jakarta
University of Indonesia rectors